Lafe Preston Ward (August 23, 1925 – April 10, 2013) was an American politician and lawyer.

Born in Williamson, West Virginia, Ward graduated from University of North Carolina, Chapel Hill and received his law degree from West Virginia University College of Law. He served in the United States Navy during World War II. Ward was city attorney of Williamson, West Virginia and served as prosecuting attorney and on the board of education for Mingo County, West Virginia. A Democrat, Ward served in the West Virginia State Senate 1971–1983. He died in Atlanta, Georgia.

Notes

1925 births
2013 deaths
People from Williamson, West Virginia
University of North Carolina at Chapel Hill alumni
West Virginia University College of Law alumni
West Virginia lawyers
Democratic Party West Virginia state senators
United States Navy personnel of World War II
West Virginia city attorneys
20th-century American lawyers